King of the Wends ( or Rex Sclavorum;) was a pan-Scandinavian title denoting sovereignty, lordship or claims over the Wends, a people who historically populated Western Slavic lands of southern coasts of the Baltic Sea, those otherwise called Mecklenburg, Holstein and Pomerania, and was used from the 12th century to 1972 by Kings of Denmark and from c. 1540 to 1973 by the Kings of Sweden.

The generally accepted interpretation is that the word refers to the Wends, West Slavic peoples that lived on the south shores of the Baltic Sea, although the situation is further complicated by the existence of the Vends, located between the Finns and the Wends and with somewhat unknown origin. One poetic explanation of the title was kingship over the antique people of the Vandals (vandalorum rex), but that idea came only in the 16th century. A recent interpretation, not much supported in academic research, has been made that the part "Vend" in the later established titles of the Kings of Sweden (three kingdoms: King of the Svear, Götar and Vends; Svears, Göters och Venders konung) means Finland, the form presumably being akin to winds, "vind". As such, the Österland—the medieval name for the Finnish part of the Swedish kingdom—was the third part of the realm. However, only forty years after the adoption of the title "king of the Wends", the Swedish kings began to style themselves as "Grand Prince of Finland" as well.

Kings of Denmark bore the title for eight centuries, after it was first adopted by King Canute VI (reigned 1182 to 1202), who conquered the lands of the Wends in Pomerania and Mecklenburg. In Germanic languages, the name was Wends, and in medieval documentation the Latin name was sclavorum rex, referring to the Slavic peoples in and around the region now known as Mecklenburg. In the 16th century, Latin sclavorum was changed to vandalorum also by Danish kings, showing the new poetic idea. The Danish Kings continued to use the title over the next seven hundred years until 1972, when Queen Margrethe II succeeded. She abandoned the use of all the royal titles except for that of Denmark's King/Queen, which is the royal style today.

When Sweden had made its final breakaway from the Kalmar union that united it with Norway and Denmark, tensions between the two rulers were high, and it showed also in their flags, coat-of-arms and titles. Gustav I of Sweden adopted c 1540 the third "kingdom" to his titles (which hitherto had only included Sweden and the Goths): he took "Vandalorumque" rex, "Venders" konung as the third name of the list of kingships. Sveriges, Göters och Venders konung ('King of Sweden, the Goths and the Wends') was used in official documentation up to the accession in 1973, of Carl XVI Gustaf of Sweden, who was the first monarch to be proclaimed Sveriges konung ("King of Sweden") and nothing else.

See also
King of the Goths
King of the Slavs

References

Scandinavia
Danish heraldry
Swedish heraldry
Danish monarchy
Swedish Empire
West Slavic history
European kings